Henry Butler (born 1948) is an Irish retired hurler who played as a goalkeeper for the Wexford senior team.

Born in Kilmuckridge, County Wexford, Butler first arrived on the inter-county scene at the age of seventeen when he first linked up with the Wexford minor team, before later joining the under-21 side. He made his senior debut during the 1976 championship. Butler went on to play a bit part for the team over the next few years, and won two Leinster medals as a non-playing substitute. He was an All-Ireland runner-up as a non-playing substitute on two occasions.

At club level Butler is a one-time All-Ireland medallist with Buffers Alley. In addition to this he also won two Leinster medals and ten championship medals.

Throughout his inter-county career Butler made 3 championship appearances for Wexford. His retirement came following the conclusion of the 1979 championship.

Honours

Team

Buffers Alley
All-Ireland Senior Club Hurling Championship (1): 1989
Leinster Senior Club Hurling Championship (2): 1986, 1988
Wexford Senior Club Hurling Championship (10) 1968, 1970, 1975, 1976, 1982, 1983, 1984, 1985, 1988, 1989

Wexford
Leinster Senior Hurling Championship (2): 1976 (sub), 1977 (sub)
Leinster Under-21 Hurling Championship (3): 1966
All-Ireland Minor Hurling Championship (1): 1966
Leinster Minor Hurling Championship (1): 1966

References

1948 births
Living people
Buffer's Alley hurlers
Wexford inter-county hurlers
Hurling goalkeepers